The 69th Bodil Awards were held on 5 March 2016 in the Bremen Theater in Copenhagen, Denmark, honoring the best national and foreign films of 2015.

On 11 February 2016 it was announced that 75-year-old Danish-French actress Anna Karina would receive the 2016 Bodil Honorary Award as "one of the most iconic" actresses of the French New Wave.

Land of Mine directed by Martin Zandvliet was the big winner at the Awards: It won the Best Danish Film Award, Roland Møller won his first Bodil Award for Best Actor in a Leading Role as Sgt. Carl Rasmussen in the film, while Louis Hofmann took home the statuette for Best Actor in a Supporting Role as a young German POW. Peter Albrechtsen received a special Bodil for sound design in the film The Idealist and Mia Stensgaard won the Henning Bahs Prize for her production design on Mænd og Høns.

Winners and nominees 
Winners in bold

Best Danish Film 
 Land of Mine
 The Idealist
 Bridgend
 Krigen
 Sommeren '92

Best Actor in a Leading Role 
 Roland Møller – Land of Mine
 Joachim Fjelstrup – Steppeulven
 Ulrich Thomsen – Sommeren '92
 Pilou Asbæk – Krigen
 Peter Plaugborg – The Idealist

Best Actress in a Leading Role 
 Mille Lehfeldt – Lang historie kort
 Ghita Nørby – Nøgle hus spejl
 Tuva Novotny for Krigen
 Hannah Murray for Bridgend
 Bodil Jørgensen for People Get Eaten

Best Actor in a Supporting Role 
 Louis Hofmann – Land of Mine
 Søren Malling – The Idealist
 Henning Jensen – Sommeren '92
 Dulfi al-Jabouri – Krigen
 Esben Smed – Sommeren '92

Best Actress in a Supporting Role 
 Trine Pallesen – Nøgle hus spejl
 Trine Dyrholm – Lang historie kort
 Dya Josefine Hauch – Lang historie kort
 Lene Maria Christensen – Sommeren '92
 Ruth Brejnholm – Skyggen af en helt

Best American Film 
 Birdman
Inside Out
 Sicario
 Star Wars: The Force Awakens
 Whiplash

Best Non-American Film 
 Mommy
 Leviathan
 Mad Max: Fury Road
 Amy
 Marshland

Best Documentary 
 The Man Who Saved the World
 Et hjem i verden
 Misfits
 Fassbinder – at elske uden at kræve
 Naturens uorden

Recipients

Bodil Honorary Award 
 Anna Karina

Bodil Special Award 
 Peter Albrechtsen, Sound editor, for editing The Idealist among other films.

Best Cinematography 
 Magnus Nordenhof Jønck for Nøgle hus spejl, Krigen and Bridgend

External awards

Henning Bahs Award 
 Mia Stensgaard for Mænd og Høns

Danish Writers Guild Best Screenplay Award 
 May el-Toukhy and Maren Louise Käehne for Lang historie kort

See also 

 2016 Robert Awards

References

External links 
  

2015 film awards
Bodil Awards ceremonies
2016 in Copenhagen
March 2016 events in Europe